Parvarrish – Kuchh Khattee Kuchh Meethi / Nayi Umar Nayi Chunauti - Parvarrish Agla Padav (English: Upbringing - Some Sour Some Sweet / New Age New Hurdles - Upbringing Next Level),  abbreviated as Parvarrish or Parvarish, is an Indian soap opera that aired on Sony Entertainment Television India and Sony Entertainment Television Asia. The show premiered on 21 November 2011 and ended on 14 August 2013. 
The serial is about two families having different ways of raising their kids. The story focuses on the lives, morals, and rituals of the families. It stars Shweta Tiwari, Rupali Ganguly, Vivek Mushran and Vishal Singh in lead roles.

Plot summary

Parvarrish primarily revolves around two families who are relatives: the Ahluwalias and the Ahujas. It focuses on the troubles they go through in bringing up their children and the lessons they learn from these experiences.

Sweety Ahluwalia (Shweta Tiwari) is very strict with her children, Rocky and Ginny (Tapasvi Mehta, Aashika Bhatia), to the point where they get frustrated with her and secretly rebel. Although she constantly scolds them and complains about their studies, she considers them her life. With her supportive husband Lakvir Singh (Vivek Mushran), she tries to provide them with the best she can.

On the other hand, Sweety's younger sister, Pinky Ahuja (Rupali Ganguly/Barkha Bisht Sengupta), wants to take care of her children, Raavi, Raashi and Sunny (Aanchal Munjal, Sparsh Khanchandani, Rakshit Wahi) by being friends with them. However, her overreacting nature often suffocates her kids and creates problems in the relationship she shares with them. She often finds a supportive friend in her caring and loving husband Jeet (Vishal Singh).

Cast 

 Ahluwalia Family
 Shweta Tiwari as Sweety Kaur Khanna Ahluwalia – Rajesh's elder daughter; Pinky and Lovely's sister; Lucky's wife; Rocky and Ginni's mother.(2011-2013)
 Vivek Mushran as Lakvinder "Lucky" Singh Ahluwalia – Bebe's son; Sweety's husband; Rocky and Ginni's father. (2011-2013)
 Tapasvi Mehta as Rakvinder "Rocky" Singh Ahluwalia – Sweety and Lucky's son; Ginni's brother. (2011-2013)
 Aashika Bhatia as Gunwant "Ginni" Kaur Ahluwalia – Sweety and Lucky's daughter; Rocky's sister. (2011-2013
 Unkwown as Mrs. Ahluwalia – Lucky's mother; Rocky and Ginni's grandmother

Ahuja Family
 Rupali Ganguly  / Barkha Sengupta as Pinky Kaur Khanna Ahuja – Rajesh's younger daughter; Sweety and Lovely's sister; Jeet's wife; Raavi, Rashi and Sunny's mother. (2011–2013) / (2013)
 Vishal Singh as Jeet Ahuja – Pinky's husband; Raavi, Rashi and Sunny's father. (2011-2013)
 Aanchal Munjal as Raavi Ahuja – Pinky and Jeet's elder daughter; Rashi and Sunny's sister. (2011-2013)
 Sparsh Khanchandani as Rashi Ahuja – Pinky and Jeet's younger daughter; Raavi and Sunny's sister. (2011-2013)
 Rakshit Wahi as Sunny Ahuja – Pinky and Jeet's son; Raavi and Rashi's brother. (2011-2013)

Khanna Family 
 Rajesh Puri as Rajesh Singh Khanna – Sweety, Pinky and Lovely's father; Rocky, Raavi, Ginni, Rashi and Sunny's grandfather (2011-2013)
 Vivek Madan as Lovely Singh Khanna – Rajesh's son; Pinky and Sweety's brother; Dolly's husband (2011-2013)
 Namrata Ramsay as Dolly Kaur Khanna – Lovely's wife (2011-2013)

Others
 Gaurav Nanda as Amit Kapoor
 Abhishek Bajaj as Nithin Mehta – Raavi's boyfriend
 Param Singh as Yudhishthir "Yudi" Sharma – Mandira's son; Rocky's friend
 Kamya Panjabi as Mandira Sharma – Yudi's mother
 Raju Kher as Senior Mr. Ahluwalia – Lucky's father; Rocky and Ginni's grandfather.
 Raanveer Chahal as Vicky
 Samara as Aishwarya Soonawaala
 Ayaz Ahmed as Aarav Sengupta
 Aashish Kaul as Bharat Sharma
 Prashant Ranyal as Siddarth Mathur
 Vaishnavi Dhanraj as Meera Siddart Mathur
 Kishwer Merchant as Parminder (Pam) – Ahuja's Neighbor
 Eshaan Sahney as Dev Sawhney 
 Aman Verma as Advocate Raghav Jaitley (RJ)
 Jiten Lalwani as Monty Singh 
 Ravi Dubey
 Mahip Marwah
 Anoop Gautam as Football Coach 
 Athar Siddiqui as Kapil (Games teacher)
 Mona Ambegaonkar as Miss Mini Mehtab (Theater Artist)

Season 2 

In May 2015, it was announced that the show would return with a sequel. In September 2015, it was announced that actors like  Sangita Ghosh, Sandeep Baswana, Vinay Jain and Gautami Kapoor would star in the sequel. The sequel began from 23 November 2015 and ended on July 7, 2016.

Adaptation 
The series was remade into Malayalam and telecasted as Snehajalakam on Surya TV.

Awards and nominations 
Indian Telly Awards 2012 
Best Child Artist (Female) - Aanchal Munjal 
 Best Ensemble Cast
ITA 2012
Best Actress (Jury) - Shweta Tiwari
Best Serial (Jury) 
Best Direction
Kalakr Awards 2013
Best Actress (Jury) - Shweta Tiwari & Rupali Ganguly
Indian Telly Awards 2013
Best Actress (Jury) - Shweta Tiwari

See also 

 List of programs broadcast by Sony Entertainment Television

References

External links
  Parvarrish's website at SET Asia

Sony Entertainment Television original programming
Indian drama television series
Indian television soap operas
2011 Indian television series debuts
2013 Indian television series endings